Teleexpress is the second news program of the TVP, broadcast daily on TVP1 and on TVP Info at 17:00 / 5:00PM. Until June 1992, it was broadcast at 17:15 / 5:15PM.

It may broadcasts at different hours on TVP1 if the schedule of some sporting events that the channel broadcast interfere with the usual airtime.

Presenters

Currently
 Beata Chmielowska-Olech (since 1998)
 Rafał Patyra (since 2016)
 Krzysztof Ziemiec (since 2019)

In the past
Wojciech Mazurkiewicz, Wojciech Reszczyński, Wojciech Nowakowski, Zbigniew Krajewski, Marek Sierocki, Sławomir Zieliński, Piotr Radziszewski, Kuba Strzyczkowski, Maciej Gudowski, Jarosław Kret, Jan Suzin (only one broadcast on 25 October 2002), Piotr Gembarowski, Tomasz Kammel, Michał Adamczyk, Sławomir Komorowski, Bożena Targosz, Jolanta Fajkowska, Magdalena Olszewska, Kinga Rusin, Hanna Smoktunowicz, Adriana Niecko, Urszula Boruch, Małgorzata Wyszyńska, Patrycja Hryniewicz-Nowak, Beata Gwoździewicz, Paweł Bukrewicz, Danuta Dobrzyńska, Katarzyna Trzaskalska, Maciej Orłoś, Marta Piasecka, Agata Biały-Cholewińska, Michał Cholewiński.

Additional Programs

Teleexpress Junior was broadcast from September 1, 1998 to June 2000 as a youth news program. Aired daily from Monday to Friday - initially at 2:30 pm, from October 12, 1998 at 3:30 pm, and from September 1999 at 4:15 pm (except Tuesdays - at 4:30 pm).

Teleexpress nocą was the evening edition of the Teleexpress news program broadcast from July 2 to October 31, 2007 between 10:50 pm and 2:00 am on TVP1. The program was broadcast from Monday to Thursday. Teleexpress nocą was more entertaining than informative, which made it even more different from the main issue of Teleexpress, which often supplements the news with funny comments. At the end of each release, a music video for the song "of goodnight" was broadcast. The program was taken off the air due to low viewership. The first edition of Teleexpress nocą, broadcast on July 2, 2007, was hosted by Radosław Brzózka.

Teleexpress Extra has been broadcasting from March 2, 2014, an information program that supplements the main issue of Teleexpress, which is broadcast daily on TVP Info at 17:15.

Teleexpress na deser - a weekend TV program broadcast on TVP Info. The program deals with the issues of cuisine, fashion, music, etc.

See also 
 Wiadomości
 Panorama (TVP2)

External links
 Teleexpress on www.tvp.pl

Polish television shows
1986 Polish television series debuts
Polish television news shows
1980s Polish television series
1990s Polish television series
2000s Polish television series
2010s Polish television series
2020s Polish television series
Telewizja Polska original programming